Affiniam is a small town in the Bignona Department in the Ziguinchor Region of south-western Senegal. In 2002 it had a population of 1620 people.
The town lies on the northern bank of the Casamance River. The area is dominated by rice farming.

A dam was built in 1988 in collaboration with China on the mangrove to Bignona to desalinate and irrigate the rice fields. The project did not really succeed due to lack of management and technical resources.

Affiniam contains what has been described as
"a splendid impluvium - a large, round mud house with a funnel-shaped roof" which was a place of refuge during wartime.

References

External links
Satellite map at Maplandia.com

Populated places in the Bignona Department
Arrondissement of Tendouck
Casamance River